Walter Lippmann  (September 23, 1889 – December 14, 1974) was an American writer, reporter and political commentator. With a career spanning 60 years, he is famous for being among the first to introduce the concept of the Cold War, coining the term "stereotype" in the modern psychological meaning, as well as critiquing media and democracy in his newspaper column and several books, most notably his 1922 book Public Opinion.

Lippmann also played a notable role as research director of Woodrow Wilson's post-World War I board of inquiry. His views on the role of journalism in a democracy were contrasted with the contemporaneous writings of John Dewey in what has been retrospectively named the Lippmann-Dewey debate. Lippmann won two Pulitzer Prizes, one for his syndicated newspaper column "Today and Tomorrow" and one for his 1961 interview of Nikita Khrushchev.

He has also been highly praised with titles ranging anywhere from "most influential" journalist of the 20th century, to "Father of Modern Journalism". Michael Schudson writes that James W. Carey considered Walter Lippmann's book Public Opinion as "the founding book of modern journalism" and also "the founding book in American media studies".

Early life and education
Lippmann was born on New York's Upper East Side as the only child of Jewish parents of German origin. According to his biographer Ronald Steel, he grew up in a "gilded Jewish ghetto". His father Jacob Lippmann was a rentier who had become wealthy through his father's textile business and his father-in-law's real estate speculation. His mother, Daisy Baum cultivated contacts in the highest circles, and regularly spent their summer holidays in Europe. The family had a reform Jewish orientation; averse to "orientalism", they attended Temple Emanu-El. Walter had his reform Jewish confirmation instead of the traditional Bar Mitzvah at the age of 14. Lippmann was emotionally distanced from both parents, but had closer ties to his maternal grandmother. The political orientation of the family was Republican.

From 1896 Lippmann attended the Sachs School for Boys, followed by the Sachs Collegiate Institute, an elitist and strictly secular private school in the German Gymnasium tradition, attended primarily by children of German-Jewish families and run by the classical philologist Dr. Julius Sachs, a son-in-law of Marcus Goldmann from the Goldman-Sachs family. Classes included 11 hours of ancient Greek and 5 hours of Latin per week.

Shortly before his 17th birthday, he entered Harvard University where he wrote for The Harvard Crimson and studied in person under George Santayana, William James, and Graham Wallas, concentrating upon philosophy and languages (he spoke German and French). He took only one course in history and one in government. He was a member of the Phi Beta Kappa society, though important social clubs rejected Jews as members.

Lippmann became a member, alongside Sinclair Lewis, of the New York Socialist Party. In 1911, Lippmann served as secretary to George R. Lunn, the first Socialist mayor of Schenectady, New York, during Lunn's first term. Lippmann resigned his post after four months, finding Lunn's programs to be worthwhile in and of themselves, but inadequate as socialism.

Career

Lippmann was a journalist, a media critic and an amateur philosopher who tried to reconcile the tensions between liberty and democracy in a complex and modern world, as in his 1920 book Liberty and the News. In 1913, Lippmann, Herbert Croly, and Walter Weyl became the founding editors of The New Republic.

During World War 1, Lippmann was commissioned a captain in the Army on June 28, 1918, and was assigned to the intelligence section of the AEF headquarters in France. He was assigned to the staff of Edward M. House in October and attached to the American Commission to negotiate peace in December. He returned to the United States in February 1919 and was immediately discharged.

Through his connection to House, Lippmann became an adviser to Wilson and assisted in the drafting of Wilson's Fourteen Points speech. He sharply criticized George Creel, whom the President appointed to head wartime propaganda efforts at the Committee on Public Information. While he was prepared to curb his liberal instincts because of the war, saying he had "no doctrinaire belief in free speech," he nonetheless advised Wilson that censorship should "never be entrusted to anyone who is not himself tolerant, nor to anyone who is unacquainted with the long record of folly which is the history of suppression."

Lippmann examined the coverage of newspapers and saw many inaccuracies and other problems. He and Charles Merz, in a 1920 study entitled A Test of the News, stated that The New York Times''' coverage of the Bolshevik Revolution was biased and inaccurate. In addition to his newspaper column "Today and Tomorrow", he wrote several books.

Lippmann was the first to bring the phrase "cold war" to a common currency, in his 1947 book by the same name.

It was Lippmann who first identified the tendency of journalists to generalize about other people based on fixed ideas. He argued that people, including journalists, are more apt to believe "the pictures in their heads" than to come to judgment by critical thinking. Humans condense ideas into symbols, he wrote, and journalism, a force quickly becoming the mass media, is an ineffective method of educating the public. Even if journalists did better jobs of informing the public about important issues, Lippmann believed "the mass of the reading public is not interested in learning and assimilating the results of accurate investigation." Citizens, he wrote, were too self-centered to care about public policy except as pertaining to pressing local issues.

Later life
After the fall of the British colony Singapore in February 1942, Lippmann authored an influential Washington Post column that criticized empire and called on western nations to "identify their cause with the freedom and security of the peoples of the East" and purging themselves of "white man's imperialism".

Following the removal from office of Secretary of Commerce (and former Vice President of the United States) Henry A. Wallace in September 1946, Lippmann became the leading public advocate of the need to respect a Soviet sphere of influence in Europe, as opposed to the containment strategy being advocated at the time by George F. Kennan.

Lippmann was elected to the American Philosophical Society in 1947 and the American Academy of Arts and Sciences in 1949.

Lippmann was an informal adviser to several presidents. On September 14, 1964, President Lyndon Johnson presented Lippmann with the Presidential Medal of Freedom. He later had a rather famous feud with Johnson over his handling of the Vietnam War of which Lippmann had become highly critical.

He won a special Pulitzer Prize for journalism in 1958, as a nationally syndicated columnist, citing "the wisdom, perception and high sense of responsibility with which he has commented for many years on national and international affairs." Four years later he won the annual Pulitzer Prize for International Reporting citing "his 1961 interview with Soviet Premier Khrushchev, as illustrative of Lippmann's long and distinguished contribution to American journalism."

Lippmann retired from his syndicated column in 1967.

Lippmann died in New York City due to cardiac arrest in 1974.

He was mentioned in the monologue before Phil Ochs' recording of "The Marines Have Landed on the Shores of Santo Domingo" on the 1966 album Phil Ochs in Concert.

Journalism

Though a journalist himself, Lippmann did not assume that news and truth are synonymous. For Lippmann, the "function of news is to signalize an event, the function of truth is to bring to light the hidden facts, to set them in relation with each other, and make a picture of reality on which men can act." A journalist's version of the truth is subjective and limited to how they construct their reality.  The news, therefore, is "imperfectly recorded" and too fragile to bear the charge as "an organ of direct democracy."

To Lippmann, democratic ideals had deteriorated: voters were largely ignorant about issues and policies and lacked the competence to participate in public life and cared little for participating in the political process. In Public Opinion (1922), Lippmann noted that modern realities threatened the stability that the government had achieved during the patronage era of the 19th century. He wrote that a "governing class" must rise to face the new challenges.

The basic problem of democracy, he wrote, was the accuracy of news and protection of sources. He argued that distorted information was inherent in the human mind. People make up their minds before they define the facts, while the ideal would be to gather and analyze the facts before reaching conclusions. By seeing first, he argued, it is possible to sanitize polluted information. Lippmann argued that interpretation as stereotypes (a word which he coined in that specific meaning) subjected us to partial truths. Lippmann called the notion of a public competent to direct public affairs a "false ideal." He compared the political savvy of an average man to a theater-goer walking into a play in the middle of the third act and leaving before the last curtain.

John Dewey in his book The Public and Its Problems, published in 1927, agreed about the irrationality of public opinion, but he rejected Lippman's call for a technocratic elite. Dewey believed that in a democracy, the public is also part of the public discourse. The Lippman-Dewey Debate, which started to be widely discussed by the late 1980s in American communication studies circles, discuss the merits of Lippman and Dewey opinions. Lippmann also figured prominently in the work Manufacturing Consent by Edward S. Herman and Noam Chomsky who cited Lippmann's advocacy of "manufacture of consent" which referred "to the management of public opinion, which [Lippmann] felt was necessary for democracy to flourish, since he felt that public opinion was an irrational force."  

Remarks about Franklin D. Roosevelt
In 1932, Lippmann infamously dismissed future President Franklin D. Roosevelt's qualifications and demeanor, writing: "Franklin D. Roosevelt is no crusader. He is no tribune of the people. He is no enemy of entrenched privilege. He is a pleasant man who, without any important qualifications for the office, would very much like to be President." Despite Roosevelt's later accomplishments, Lippmann stood by his words, saying: "That I will maintain to my dying day was true of the Franklin Roosevelt of 1932." He believed his judgment was an accurate summation of Roosevelt's 1932 campaign, saying it was "180 degrees opposite to the New Deal. The fact is that the New Deal was wholly improvised after Roosevelt was elected."

Mass culture
Lippmann coined the phrase "Great Society" in 1921 (Essay: "The World Outside and the Pictures in Our Heads")

Lippmann was an early and influential commentator on mass culture, notable not for criticizing or rejecting mass culture entirely but discussing how it could be worked with by a government licensed "propaganda machine" to keep democracy functioning. In his first book on the subject, Public Opinion (1922), Lippmann said that mass man functioned as a "bewildered herd" who must be governed by "a specialized class whose interests reach beyond the locality." The elite class of intellectuals and experts were to be a machinery of knowledge to circumvent the primary defect of democracy, the impossible ideal of the "omnicompetent citizen". This attitude was in line with contemporary capitalism, which was made stronger by greater consumption.

Later, in The Phantom Public (1925), Lippmann recognized that the class of experts were also, in most respects, outsiders to any particular problem, and hence not capable of effective action. Philosopher John Dewey (1859–1952) agreed with Lippmann's assertions that the modern world was becoming too complex for every citizen to grasp all its aspects, but Dewey, unlike Lippmann, believed that the public (a composite of many "publics" within society) could form a "Great Community" that could become educated about issues, come to judgments and arrive at solutions to societal problems.

In 1943, George Seldes described Lippmann as one of the two most influential columnists in the United States.

From the 1930s to the 1950s, Lippmann became even more skeptical of the "guiding" class. In The Public Philosophy (1955), which took almost twenty years to complete, he presented a sophisticated argument that intellectual elites were undermining the framework of democracy. The book was very poorly received in liberal circles.

Legacy
The Walter Lippmann House at Harvard University, which houses the Nieman Foundation for Journalism, is named after him.

Almond–Lippmann consensus
Similarities between the views of Lippmann and Gabriel Almond produced what became known as the Almond–Lippmann consensus, which is based on three assumptions:

 Public opinion is volatile, shifting erratically in response to the most recent developments. Mass beliefs early in the 20th century were "too pacifist in peace and too bellicose in war, too neutralist or appeasing in negotiations or too intransigent"
 Public opinion is incoherent, lacking an organised or a consistent structure to such an extent that the views of US citizens could best be described as "nonattitudes"
 Public opinion is irrelevant to the policy-making process. Political leaders ignore public opinion because most Americans can neither "understand nor influence the very events upon which their lives and happiness are known to depend."Kris, Ernst, and Nathan Leites. 1947. "Trends in Twentieth Century Propaganda." In Psychoanalysis and the Social Sciences, ed. Geza Rheim, pp. 393–409. New York: International University Press.

Liberal/neoliberal debate

French philosopher Louis Rougier convened a meeting of primarily French and German liberal intellectuals in Paris in August 1938 to discuss the ideas put forward by Lippmann in his work The Good Society (1937). They named the meeting after Lippmann, calling it the Colloque Walter Lippmann. The meeting is often considered the precursor to the first meeting of the Mont Pèlerin Society, convened by Friedrich von Hayek in 1947. At both meetings discussions centered around what a new liberalism, or "neoliberalism", should look like.

 Private life 
Lippmann was married twice, the first time from 1917 to 1937 to Faye Albertson (*23 March 1893 – 17 March 1975). Faye Albertson was the daughter of Ralph Albertson, a pastor of the Congregational Church. He was one of the pioneers of Christian socialism and the social gospel movement in the spirit of George Herron. During his studies at Harvard, Walter often visited the Albertsons' estate in West Newbury, Massachusetts, where they had founded a socialist cooperative, the (Cyrus Field) Willard Cooperative Colony. Faye Albertson married Jesse Heatley after the divorce in 1940.

Lippmann was divorced by Faye Albertson to be able to marry Helen Byrne Armstrong in 1938 (died 16 February 1974), daughter of James Byrne. She divorced her husband Hamilton Fish Armstrong, the editor of Foreign Affairs. He was the only close friend in Lippmann's life.  The friendship and involvement in Foreign Affairs ended when a hotel in Europe accidentally forwarded Lippmann's love letters to Mr. Armstrong. 

 Bibliography 

Articles
 "The Campaign Against Sweating". The New Republic, March 27, 1915.
 "What Program Shall the United States Stand for in International Relations?". Annals of the American Academy of Political and Social Science, Vol. 66, July 1916, pp. 60–70. 
 "The World Conflict in its Relation to American Democracy." Annals of the American Academy of Political and Social Science, Vol. 72, July 1917, pp. 1–10. 
 "The Basic Problem of Democracy: What Liberty Means," The Atlantic Monthly, Vol. 124, 1919, pp. 616.
 "Liberty and the News," The Atlantic Monthly, Vol. 124, 1919, pp. 779. 
"Democracy, Foreign Policy and the Split Personality of the Modern Statesman." Annals of the American Academy of Political and Social Science, Vol. 102, July 1922, pp. 190–193. 
 "Today and Tomorrow." Washington Post, February 12, 1942. Full text available.
 "A Talk With Mr. K." November 10, 1958.
 "Nearing the Brink in Vietnam." Newsweek, April 12, 1965, pp. 25–46.

Book reviews
 Review of The Intimate Papers of Colonel House by Charles Seymour. Foreign Affairs, Vol. 4, No. 3, April 1926.  

Essays
 "The Basic Problem of Democracy." November 1919, pp. 616–627.
This essay later became the first chapter Liberty and the News.
 "Concerning Senator Borah." Foreign Affairs, Vol. 4, No. 2, January 1926, pp. 211–222.  
 "Vested Rights and Nationalism in Latin-America." Foreign Affairs, Vol. 5, No. 3, April 1927, pp. 353–363.  
 "Second Thoughts on Havana." Foreign Affairs, Vol. 6, No. 4, July 1928, pp. 541–554.  
 "Church and State in Mexico: The American Mediation." Foreign Affairs, Vol. 8, No. 2, January 1930. pp. 186–207.  
 "The London Naval Conference: An American View." Foreign Affairs, Vol. 8, No. 4, July 1930, pp. 499–518.  
 "Ten Years: Retrospect and Prospect." Foreign Affairs, Vol. 11, No. 1, October 1932, pp. 51–53.  
 "Self-Sufficiency: Some Random Reflections." Foreign Affairs, Vol. 12, No. 2, January 1934, pp. 207–217.  
 "Britain and America: The Prospects of Political Cooperation in the Light of Their Paramount Interests." Foreign Affairs, Vol. 13, No. 3, April 1936, pp. 363–372.  
 "Rough-Hew Them How We Will." Foreign Affairs, Vol. 15, No. 4, July 1937, pp. 586–594.  
 "The Cold War." Foreign Affairs, Vol. 65, No. 4, Spring 1987, pp. 869–884.  

Reports
 "A Test of the News." The New Republic, Vol. 23, No. 296, August 1920. 42 pages.

Books
 A Preface to Politics. Mitchell Kennerley, 1913. . Audiobook available.
 Drift and Mastery. University of Wisconsin Press, 1914. . Full text available. 
 The Stakes of Diplomacy. New York: Henry Holt & Co., 1915.
 The Political Scene. New York: Henry Holt & Co., 1919.
 Liberty and the News. New York: Harcourt, Brace & Howe, 1920.
 Public Opinion. New York: Harcourt, Brace & Co., 1922. . Audiobook available.
 The Phantom Public. Piscataway, NJ: Transaction Publishers, 1925. 
 Men of Destiny. New York: The Macmillan Company, 1927. . Excerpts available.
 American Inquisitors. New York: The Macmillan Company, 1928.
 A Preface to Morals. London: George Allen & Unwin, 1929. 
 Interpretations, 1931-1932. New York: The Macmillan Company, 1932.
 The United States in World Affair, 1931. New York: Harper & Bros, 1932.
 The United States in World Affairs, 1932. New York: Harper & Bros, 1933.
 The Method of Freedom. New York: The Macmillan Company, 1934.
 Interpretations, 1933-1935. New York: The Macmillan Company, 1936.
 The Good Society. New York: Atlantic Monthly Press, 1937. 
 U.S. Foreign Policy: Shield of the Republic. Boston: Atlantic Monthly Press, 1943.
 U.S. War Aims. Boston: Atlantic Monthly Press, 1944. 
 The Cold War. New York: Harper & Row, 1947. 
 The Public Philosophy, with William O. Scroggs. New York: New American Library, 1955. 
 The Coming Tests With Russia. Boston: Atlantic Monthly Press, 1961. 

Pamphlets
 Notes on the Crisis (No. 5). New York: John Day, 1932. 28 pages.
 A New Social Order (No. 25). John Day, 1933. 28 pages.
 The New Imperative. New York: The Macmillan Company, 1935. 52 pages.

See also

 Harold Lasswell
 Edward Bernays
 Progressivism
 Liberal democracy

References

Further reading
Articles
 Baker, Matt. "Walter Lippmann: How to Cure Liberal Democracy, Then and Now" The American Interest, November 19, 2019.
 Clavé, Francis. "Comparative Study of Lippmann's and Hayek's Liberalisms (or Neo-liberalisms)." The European Journal of the History of Economic Thought, Vol. 22, Issue 6, 2015, pp. 978–999. 

 Goodwin, Craufurd D. "The promise of expertise: Walter Lippmann and the policy sciences." Policy Sciences 28.4 (1995): 317-345. online
 Gorbach, Julien. "The Non-Jewish Jew: Walter Lippmann and the Pitfalls of Journalistic 'Detachment'." American Journalism 37.3 (2020): 321-345. online

 Jackson, Ben. "Freedom, the Common Good, and the Rule of Law: Lippmann and Hayek on Economic Planning." Journal of the History of Ideas, Vol. 72, 2012, pp. 47–68. 
 Lacey, Robert J. "Walter Lippmann: Unlikely Conservative." in Lacey, Pragmatic Conservatism (Palgrave Macmillan, 2016) pp. 63-107.
 Logevall, Fredrik. "First Among Critics: Walter Lippmann and the Vietnam War." Journal of American-East Asian Relations (1995): 351-375 online.

 Porter, Patrick. "Beyond the American Century: Walter Lippmann and American Grand Strategy, 1943–1950." Diplomacy & Statecraft, Vol. 22, No. 4, 2011, pp. 557–577.
  Seyb, Ronald P. "What Walter Saw: Walter Lippmann, the New York World, and Scientific Advocacy as an Alternative to the News-Opinion Dichotomy." Journalism History, Vol. 41, No. 2, 2015, pp. 58+.
Van Rythoven, E. (2021). "Walter Lippmann, emotion, and the history of international theory." International Theory Whitfield, Stephen J. "Part IV: The Journalist as Intellectual. Walter Lippmann: A Career in Media's Rays." Journal of Popular Culture, Vol. 15, No. 1, 1981, pp. 68–77. 

Books
 Adams, Larry Lee. Walter Lippmann. Boston: Twayne Publishers, 1977. , short biography
 Blum, D. Steven. Walter Lippmann: Cosmopolitanism in the Century of Total War (1984), scholarly biography

 Forcey, Charles. The Crossroads of Liberalism: Croly, Weyl, Lippmann, and the Progressive Era, 1900-1925. New York: Oxford University Press, 1961. 
 Goodwin, Craufurd D. Walter Lippmann: Public Economist. Harvard University Press, 2014. 
 Riccio, Barry D. Walter Lippmann: Odyssey of a Liberal. Transaction Publishers, 1994. 
 Schapsmeier, Edward L. and Frederick H. Schapsmeier.  Walter Lippmann: philosopher-journalist (Washington: Public Affairs Press, 1969), scholarly biography
 Steel, Ronald. Walter Lippmann and the American Century. Little, Brown & Co., 1980. , a major scholarly biography
 Foreign Affairs online review.

 Wasniewski, Matthew A. "Walter Lippmann, Strategic Internationalism, the Cold War, and Vietnam, 1943-1967" (Ph.D. dissertation). University of Maryland, 2004.
 Wellborn, Charles. Twentieth Century Pilgrimage: Walter Lippmann and the Public Philosophy. LSU Press, 1969. 
 Wright, Benjamin F. Five Public Philosophies of Walter Lippmann. University of Texas Press, 2015. 

Primary sources
 Public Philosopher: Selected Letters of Walter Lippmann. New York: Ticknor & Fields, 1985.
 Rossiter, Clinton, and James Lare (eds.). The Essential Lippmann: A Political Philosophy for Liberal Democracy. Cambridge: Harvard University Press, 1963.

External links

 Articles by Walter Lippmann at The Atlantic Articles by Walter Lippmann at Foreign Affairs Books by Walter Lippmann at HathiTrust
 Works by Walter Lippmann at JSTOR
 
 
 
 Public Opinion (1922) from American Studies at the University of Virginia.
 * Walter Lippmann Papers (MS 326). Manuscripts and Archives, Yale University Library.
 Walter Lippmann, "The Mental Age of Americans", New Republic 32, no. 412 (October 25, 1922): 213–15; no. 413 (November 1, 1922): 246–48; no. 414 (November 8, 1922): 275–77; no. 415 (November 15, 1922): 297–98; no. 416 (November 22, 1922): 328–30; no. 417 (November 29, 1922): 9–11.
 "Writings of Walter Lippmann" from C-SPAN's American Writers: A Journey Through History''
 The American Presidency Project – Remarks at the Presentation of the 1964 Presidential Medal of Freedom Awards – September 14, 1964
 Walter Lippmann, Patriotism and state sovereignty (1929)
 

 Robert O. Anthony Collection of Walter Lippmann (MS 766) – Yale University Library

1889 births
1974 deaths
American columnists
American foreign policy writers
American male non-fiction writers
American male journalists
American magazine editors
American magazine founders
American people of German-Jewish descent
American political writers
Harvard University alumni
Jewish American writers
The New Republic people
Peabody Award winners
Presidential Medal of Freedom recipients
Progressive Era in the United States
Pulitzer Prize winners for journalism 
Pulitzer Prize for International Reporting winners
Writers from New York City
Member of the Mont Pelerin Society
 Members of the American Philosophical Society